Taş is a Turkish word meaning "stone", often used as a surname, it may refer to:

Asya Nur Taş (born 1994), Turkish individual and group rhythmic gymnast
 Atilla Taş (born 1975), Turkish singer
 Ayşe Taş (born 1987), Turkish female boxer
 Aysel Taş (born 1964), Bulgarian born Turkish female javelin thrower
 Coşkun Taş (born 1935), Turkish footballer 
 Didem Taş (born 1992), Turkish women's footballer
 Erol Taş (1928–1998), Turkish actor
 Mehmet Taş (born 1991), Turkish footballer
 Nizamettin Taş (born 1961), Turkish military commander of Kurdish separatist organization PKK
 Yakup Taş (1959–2023), Turkish politician

See also
TAS/Tas

Turkish-language surnames